The equivalent-teeth shrew mole (Uropsilus aequodonenia) is a species of mammal in the family Talpidae. It is endemic to Sichuan, China. It is characterized by having nine teeth in the row above and nine teeth in the lower row. The data indicate that it is the sister taxon of U. andersoni. Its specific name, aequodonenia, means 'equivalent teeth' in Latin.

References

Mammals of China
Endemic fauna of Sichuan
Uropsilus
Mammals described in 2013